The Battlefields of England was a work of non-fiction by A. H. Burne first published in 1950 by Methuen. A sequel, More Battlefields of England, followed in 1952. In 1996 the two works were combined under "The Battlefields of England" title.

The book explores battlefields in respect of the following battles:
Caradoc's Last Fight AD 51
The Battle of Mount Badon AD 500
The Battle of Deorham AD 577
Wansdyke and the Battle of Ellandun AD 825
The Battle of Ashdown 8 January 871
The Battle of Ethandun AD 878
The Battle of Brunanburh AD 937
The Battle of Maldon August 991
The Battle of Assingdon 18 October 1016
The Battle of Stamford Bridge 25 September 1066
The Battle of Hastings 14 October 1066
The Battle of the Standard, or Northallerton: 22 August 1138
The Battle of Lewes 14 May 1264)
The Battle of Evesham 4 August 1265)
The Battle of Neville's Cross 17 October 1346
The Battle of Otterburn 19 August 1388
The Battle of Shrewsbury 21 July 1403
The First Battle of St. Albans 22 May 1455
The Battle of Blore Heath 23 September 1459
The Second Battle of St. Albans 17 February
The Battle of Towton 29 March 1461
The Battle of Barnet 14 April 1471
The Battle of Tewkesbury 14 May 1471
The Battle of Bosworth 22 August 1485
The Battle of Stoke Field 16 June 1487
The Battle of Flodden 9 September 1513
The Battle of Edgehill 22 October 1642
The Battle of Lansdown 5 July 1643
The Battle of Roundway Down 13 July 1643
The First Battle of Newbury 20 October 1643
The Battle of Cheriton 29 March 1644
The Battle of Marston Moor 2 July 1644
The Second Battle of Newbury 28 October 1644
The Battle of Naseby 14 June 1645
The Battle of Langport 10 July 1645
The Battle of Worcester 3 September 1651
The Battle of Sedgemoor 6 July 1685

References

1950 non-fiction books
1996 non-fiction books
20th-century history books
History books about England
History books about wars
Methuen Publishing books